Čedomir Radić (born 6 January 1993) is a Bosnian Serb football goalkeeper who plays for Vfr Garching in Regionalliga (4th division).Novo pojačanje: Radić i Čebić u Podrinju‚ blic.rs, 11 July 2017</ref>

Club career
Born in Bijeljina, Radić with youth categories of Belgrade clubs Lokomotiva, Red Star and Rad. He started his senior career with OFK Mladenovac in the 2011–12 Serbian First League season. After 2 seasons he spent with the club, Radić signed with the Serbian SuperLiga side Čukarički in summer 2013, but moved on loan to BASK shortly after. Radić stayed with Čukarički until 2015, but he performed with Sinđelić Beograd as a loaned player between 2014 and 2015. During the first half of 2015–16 season, Radić spent with Mladost Velika Obarska, where he made 16 appearances in the First League of the Republika Srpska. He also played with Goražde in Premier League of Bosnia and Herzegovina for the rest of same season. In summer 2016, Radić made one-year deal with Metalac Gornji Milanovac.

In 2018 he moved abroad to play in the German lower leagues.

Career statistics

Club

References

External links
 

1993 births
Living people
People from Bijeljina
Serbs of Bosnia and Herzegovina
Association football goalkeepers
Bosnia and Herzegovina footballers
OFK Mladenovac players
FK Čukarički players
FK BASK players
FK Sinđelić Beograd players
FK Mladost Velika Obarska players
FK Goražde players
FK Metalac Gornji Milanovac players
FK Podrinje Janja players
Serbian First League players
First League of the Republika Srpska players
Premier League of Bosnia and Herzegovina players
Landesliga players
Bosnia and Herzegovina expatriate footballers
Expatriate footballers in Serbia
Bosnia and Herzegovina expatriate sportspeople in Serbia
Expatriate footballers in Germany
Bosnia and Herzegovina expatriate sportspeople in Germany